Ben Paolucci (born March 5, 1937) is a former American football defensive tackle. He played for the Detroit Lions in 1959.

References

1937 births
Living people
American football defensive tackles
Wayne State Warriors football players
Detroit Lions players